Chysis laevis is a species of epiphytic orchid. Its distribution is across lower Mexico and Central America in places such as Chiapas, Oaxaca, Guatemala, El Salvador, Honduras, Nicaragua and Costa Rica.

References

laevis
Epiphytic orchids
Orchids of Mexico
Orchids of Central America
Plants described in 1840